Boismont is a commune in the Meurthe-et-Moselle department in northeastern France.

Population

See also 
 Communes of the Meurthe-et-Moselle department

References

Communes of Meurthe-et-Moselle